NGC 2294 is an elliptical galaxy within the constellation Gemini, discovered by George Johnstone Stoney on February 22, 1849. The visual magnitude is 14, and the apparent size is 0.8 by 0.4 arc minutes.

References

External links 

Gemini (constellation)
Elliptical galaxies
2294
019729